Sudhin Datta (born 1951) is an ExxonMobil Chemical scientist noted for the development of Vistamaxx propylene-based elastomers.

Education

Datta earned his undergraduate degree in chemistry from Indian Institute of Technology at Kanpur in 1974.  He completed his Ph.D. in organometallic chemistry from Harvard University in 1978. He held postdoctoral appointments at the University of Toronto and at the University of Chicago.

Career

In 1981, he joined Exxon Chemical Co. where his research focused on the development of polyolefin elastomers.

Awards

 2015 – Charles Goodyear Medal of the Rubber Division of the American Chemical Society

References

Living people
Polymer scientists and engineers
IIT Kanpur alumni
Harvard University alumni
1951 births
University of Toronto people
University of Chicago people
ExxonMobil people